Neotyphodium is a genus of endophytic fungi symbiotic with grasses. It used to contain a number of asexually reproducing species that colonize the leaves of cool-season grasses, but most of them, including the type species N. coenophialum, were merged into the genus Epichloë in 2014. Two species of unclear position were excluded from this treatment:

Neotyphodium chilense from Chile should be treated as Acremonium chilense since the previous transfer to Neotyphodium is untested.
Neotyphodium starrii is closely related to N. coenophialum, but the taxonomic status within Epichloë (whether it is a distinct species or not) is unclear (nomen dubium).

References

Hypocreales genera
Clavicipitaceae
Symbiosis
Taxa described in 1996